The Crisp Building is a historic office building located at 1970 Main St. in Sarasota, Florida. The T. H. Crisp Company, a developer led by Thomas H. Crisp, constructed the building in 1926. The Crisp Company built many of Sarasota's homes and residential developments in the 1920s and 1930s. The building has also served as a meeting hall for Sarasota's chapter of the Loyal Order of Moose. The building was designed in the Mediterranean Revival style and is one of the best-preserved examples of the style in downtown Sarasota.

It was designed by Clas & Shepherd and was built by contractors Adair & Sentor.

Its original windows were replaced by aluminum ones in 1990.  Upper floor interiors were modified in the 1970s; the first floor was renovated during 1990-98.

On April 21, 2000, the building was added to the U.S. National Register of Historic Places.

Notes

References

External links
 Sarasota County listings at National Register of Historic Places
 Crisp Building at Florida's Office of Cultural and Historical Programs

Commercial buildings on the National Register of Historic Places in Florida
National Register of Historic Places in Sarasota County, Florida
Buildings and structures in Sarasota, Florida
Mediterranean Revival architecture in Florida

1926 establishments in Florida